La dame du Caire (English: The Lady from Cairo, Arabic: سيدة القاهرة) is a 1991 Moroccan film directed by Moumen Smihi. It was filmed and produced in Egypt alongside Egyptian artists.

Synopsis 
Jawhara, a young peasant girl from the Nile, becomes a famous singer and relocates to Cairo. Fame, money and love cannot make her forget the passion she feels for her twin brother.

Cast 

 Youssra
 Gamil Ratib
 Nabil Halafaoui
 Mahmoud Himida
 Abdelaziz Makhioune

References

External links 
 

1991 films
Moroccan drama films